Louis Eugene Bullard (May 6, 1956 - April 18, 2010) was an American football offensive tackle who played three seasons with the Seattle Seahawks of the National Football League. He was drafted by the Seattle Seahawks in the fifth round of the 1978 NFL Draft. Bullard played college football at Jackson State University and attended Horn Lake High School in Horn Lake, Mississippi. He was also a member of the Boston/New Orleans/Portland Breakers of the United States Football League. He was inducted into the Jackson State University Sports Hall of Fame in 1994. He died of cancer on April 18, 2010.

References

External links
Just Sports Stats

1956 births
Players of American football from Mississippi
American football offensive tackles
African-American players of American football
Jackson State Tigers football players
Seattle Seahawks players
Boston/New Orleans/Portland Breakers players
Deaths from cancer in Tennessee
People from Hernando, Mississippi
2010 deaths
20th-century African-American sportspeople
21st-century African-American people